Johnny Ward (1940/1941 – 30 December 2019) was an English professional rugby league footballer who played in the 1950s, 1960s and 1970s.

Career
Ward was born in Castleford, West Yorkshire and signed for Featherstone Rovers in 1959. He failed to make any appearance for Featherstone and signed for his home town team, Castleford, the following year. After spending 10 years with Castleford he moved to Salford in 1970 for whom he played until he retired at the end of the 1972/73 season.

International honours
Ward won caps for England while at Castleford in 1969 against Wales and France, while at Salford in 1970 against France, and won caps for Great Britain while at Castleford in 1963 against Australia, in 1964 against France (two matches), and while at Salford in 1970 against New Zealand.

County honours
Ward won caps for Yorkshire while at Castleford playing  in the 15-9 victory over New Zealand at Castleford's stadium on 20 September 1965, playing  in the 16-13 victory over Lancashire at Swinton's stadium on 10 November 1965, playing right- in the 10–5 victory over Lancashire at Hull Kingston Rovers' stadium on 25 September 1968, and left- in the 42–3 victory over Cumberland at Hull Kingston Rovers' stadium on 1 October 1969.

County League appearances
Ward played in Castleford's Yorkshire County League victory during the 1964–65 season.

Challenge Cup Final appearances
Ward played right-, i.e. number 10, in Castleford's 11-6 victory over Salford in the 1969 Challenge Cup Final during the 1968–69 season at Wembley Stadium, London on Saturday 17 May 1969, in front of a crowd of 97,939.

County Cup Final appearances
Ward played right-, i.e. number 10, in Castleford's 11–22 defeat by Leeds in the 1968 Yorkshire Cup Final  at Belle Vue, Wakefield, on 19 October 1968, and played right- in Salford's 25–11 victory over Swinton in the 1972 Lancashire Cup Final  at Wilderspool Stadium, Warrington on 21 October 1972.

BBC2 Floodlit Trophy Final appearances
Ward played  in Castleford's 4–0 victory over St. Helens in the 1965 BBC2 Floodlit Trophy Final  at Knowsley Road, St. Helens on 14 December 1965, and played  in the 8-5 victory over Leigh in the 1967 BBC2 Floodlit Trophy Final at Headingley Rugby Stadium, Leeds, on Saturday 16 January 1968.

Player's No.6 Trophy Final appearances
Ward played left- in Salford's 7–12 defeat by Leeds in the Player's No.6 Trophy Final  at Fartown, Huddersfield, on 24 March 1973.

Honoured at Castleford Tigers
Ward is a Tigers Hall Of Fame inductee.

References

1940s births
2019 deaths
Castleford Tigers players
England national rugby league team players
English rugby league players
Great Britain national rugby league team players
Rugby league hookers
Rugby league players from Castleford
Rugby league props
Salford Red Devils players
Yorkshire rugby league team players